Diogo de Melo de Castro was the 11th & 13th Governor of Portuguese Ceylon. De Melo was first appointed in 1633 under Philip III of Portugal, he was Governor until 1635 and then in 1636 until 1638. He died in the Battle of Gannoruwa and was succeeded by Jorge de Almeida and António Mascarenhas respectively.

References

Governors of Portuguese Ceylon
16th-century Portuguese people
17th-century Portuguese people